Tranquil Creek Provincial Park is a provincial park in British Columbia, Canada, located at the head of the Kennedy River, east of the head of Bedwell Sound on Vancouver Island.

See also
Clayoquot Sound Biosphere Reserve

References

Clayoquot Sound region
Provincial parks of British Columbia